Roger Zogolovitch FRSA  (born 1947) is a British architect and independent developer based in London.

History

Zogolovitch studied at the Architectural Association School of Architecture (AA) in London (1965-1971), and served as president to the Architectural Association (1991–93).

In 1976 he co-founded architecture practice CZWG, where he was a partner (1976-1986). He later established Lake Estates Ltd (1982); Charterhouse Estates Ltd with the Water Authorities Superannuation Fund WASF (1986–1990); and Solidspace (2003-ongoing), an independent developer.

He was Director of the Infrastructure and Development course at the London School of Economics (1998-2003). He was appointed the Royal Academy of Arts’s Honorary Surveyor in 2015. He is a Fellow of the UK Royal Society of Arts.

Education
 1971, Architectural Association School of Architecture

Notable Projects

As developer:

 2018 - 81-87 Weston Street, London, with Allford Hall Monaghan Morris
 2017 - The Houseboat, Poole, with Mole Architects
 2016 - Shepherdess Walk, London, with Jaccaud Zein Architects
 2012 – Essex Mews, London, with Matthew Wood Architects 
 2012 – Stapleton Hall Road, London, with Stephen Taylor Architects
 2009 – Donaldson Road, London, with Groves Natcheva
 2003 - One Centaur Street, London, with Alex de Rijke and Sadie Morgan, dRMM

As architect:

 1985 - Royalty Studios
 1989 - Alaska Factory, Southwark
 1985 - Cascades, Isle of Dogs with Rex Wilkinson and Kentish Homes
 1976 - Riverside Restaurant, to a design by the architects Piers Gough and Roger Zogolovitch

Publications

Teaching

 Infrastructure and Development, Director (1998-2003), London School of Economics

Awards

 2018 - Royal Institute of British Architects London Award and Royal Institute of British Architects National Award (81-87 Weston Street)
 2018 - Housing Design Award (81-87 Weston Street)
 2017 – Stephen Lawrence Prize (The Houseboat)
 2017 – RIBA South West Award (The Houseboat) 
 2017 – European Union Prize for Contemporary Architecture shortlist (Shepherdess Walk)
 2004 Civic Trust Awards (One Centaur Street)
 2003 Commission for Architecture and the Built Environment Building for Life Award (One Centaur Street)  
 2018 – Sunday Times British Homes Award (81-87 Weston St)
 2018 – Construct Concrete Awards

Honours

 Honorary Surveyor, Royal Academy of Arts, appointed 2015 
 Fellow, Royal Society of Arts

See also

References

External links

Living people
1947 births
Architects from London
Alumni of the Architectural Association School of Architecture
People associated with the London School of Economics
Honorary Members of the Royal Academy